The Chicago Bruisers were a professional arena football team based in Rosemont, Illinois. They were founded in 1987 as a charter member of the Arena Football League (AFL). They played their home games at Rosemont Horizon.

History

Founding (1987)

The Bruisers were an outgrowth of the Chicago Politicians, a team put together by Jim Foster to play an exhibition game to prove the feasibility of the sport the previous year. The team logo depicted a bulldog. One of the founders of the Bruisers was former Chicago Bears linebacker and WSCR host Doug Buffone.

The Bruisers were part of the 1987 "Showcase Game", losing to the Miami Vise by a score of 33–30.

The Bruisers took a chance with a young team that averaged 25 years of age. The Bruisers' lost their first game in franchise history, 44–52 in overtime, to the Denver Dynamite. The Bruisers struggled in their second game, giving up 45 points in the first half before losing 23–60 to the Pittsburgh Gladiators. Despite getting off to a 2–3 start, the Bruisers had an opportunity to make it to ArenaBowl I with a win in the final week of the season against the Dynamite. The Bruisers however would lose 35–52. They finished with a record of 2–4 and failed to qualify for the playoffs.

The Bruisers' play-by-play announcer on radio and TV for all three of their seasons was Les Grobstein and their color commentator was Chicago Bears tight end Emery Moorehead.

Moss and ArenaBowl II (1988)

The Bruisers, like the Pittsburgh Gladiators but unlike the other two charter teams, the Denver Dynamite and the Washington Commandos, returned to play in the 1988 season. In February, the team hired Perry Moss as the franchise's second coach. Moss also served as general manager. The team competed in ArenaBowl II that year, losing 24–13 to the Detroit Drive.

End of the Bruisers (1989)

The Bruisers would be disbanded after competing in the 1989 season. The final two games they played were in exhibition games overseas against the Detroit Drive in Paris and then London in October 1989.

The rights to the Bruisers name and history were purchased by Arena Football 1 in December 2009, along with the rest of the Arena Football League. There was a possibility that the AF1's new expansion team in Chicago would adopt the Bruisers name, but said team instead decided to adopt the identity of the Chicago Rush instead. Since the Rush and the Bruisers never played at the same time, it was conceivable that the new Rush would adopt the history of both the old Rush and the Bruisers.

2011 Honors
In 2011, the Chicago Rush celebrated its 10th season in the Arena Football League and honored the Chicago Bruisers.

In the Rush home opener on March 18, 2011 against the Philadelphia Soul, Chicago wore black uniforms similar to the Bruisers with a patch featuring the original Bruiser Bulldog. In the game, Chicago won the game 62–28. The Rush also adopted a real bulldog from a local Chicago pound that can be seen during games around the arena. Starting during the 2011 season, the Chicago Rush began wearing black uniforms more often over their traditional navy home jerseys the team has worn from 2001 to 2010 to honor the Bruisers.

Notable players

Final roster

Arena Football League Hall of Famers

Individual awards

Chicago Bruisers All-Arena players
The following Bruisers players have been named to All-Arena Teams:
 QB Ben Bennett (1)
 FB/LB Billy Stone (1)
 WR/DB Reggie Smith (2), Carl Aikens, Jr. (2)
 OL/DL Brent Johnson (1), Jeff Faulkner (1), Osia Lewis (1)
 DS Durwood Roquemore (1)
 K Nick Mike-Mayer (1), Marco Morales (1)

Other notable players
 QB Jimbo Fisher (1988) – Threw just four passes for the Bruisers. He currently serves as head coach of the Texas A&M Aggies.

Notable coaches

Head coaches
Note: Statistics are correct through the end of the 1989 Arena Football League season.

Season-by-season

|-
|1987 || 2 || 4 || 0 || 3rd || --
|-
|1988 || 10 || 1 || 1 || 1st || Won Semifinals (Los Angeles 29-16) Lost ArenaBowl II (Detroit 23-14)
|-
|1989 || 1 || 3 || 0 || 4th || Lost Week 1 (Detroit 43-10)
|-
!Totals || 13 || 8 || 1
|colspan="2"| (including playoffs)
|}

Media
The Chicago Bruisers are also featured in the film Kinjite: Forbidden Subjects, directed by J. Lee Thompson and starring Charles Bronson. The game shown sees the Bruisers visit the Los Angeles Cobras. It was released in early 1989.

The team appeared on the game EA Sports Arena Football as a hidden bonus team.

References

External links
 Chicago Bruisers at ArenaFan.com

 
American football teams established in 1987
Sports clubs disestablished in 1989
Rosemont, Illinois
Bruisers
Defunct Arena Football League teams
American football teams in Illinois
1987 establishments in Illinois
1989 disestablishments in Illinois